Benno Besson (born René-Benjamin Besson; 4 November 1922 in Yverdon-les-Bains – 16 February 2006 in Berlin, Germany) was a Swiss actor and director. He had great success as director at Volksbühne Berlin, Deutsches Theater and Berliner Ensemble in East Berlin, where he went by an invitation of Bertolt Brecht in 1949.

Some of his acquainted stagings were The Dragon by Evgeny Schwartz, so that he travelled with Deutsches Theater all-around Europe and Asia (also in Japan), and Der Frieden (Aristophanes edited by Peter Hacks). 

He became the Intendant at Volksbühne in the 1960s and worked often with Heiner Müller. In his plays, he worked amongst others with the popular actors Fred Düren, Eberhard Esche and Ursula Karusseit. He had six children, including actress Katharina Thalbach.

References

Further reading

External links

 

1922 births
2006 deaths
People from Yverdon-les-Bains
Swiss male stage actors
Swiss Protestants
Swiss theatre directors
Swiss film directors